Dagestan State Pedagogical University (DSPU; , Dagestanskiy gosudarstvennyy pedagogicheskiy universitet; DGPU) is a state university in Southern Federal District of Russia located in the city of Makhachkala, the capital of the Republic of Dagestan.

History 
There is controversy about the DSPU's founding date. The “History” section of the DSPU site mentions 12 November 1917 when the Pedagogical Institute was opened in the town Temirkhan-Shura (modern Buynaksk). In 1931, the Pedagogical Institute was opened in Makhachkala. However, in the “Information” section, the founding date of the DSPU is 1 November 1943. On this day, by the decision of the Council of People's Commissars of the RSFSR No. 903, the Dagestan Women's Teacher's Institute was organized, in which girls of the indigenous ethnicities of Dagestan were trained as teachers for the seven-year schools of the republic. The institute began work on 1 October 1944.

On 31 July 1951, the institute was named after the national poet of Dagestan Gamzat Tsadasa. By the Decree of the Council of People's Commissars of the Dagestan ASSR dated 4 August 1954, No. 285, the Dagestan State Women's Teacher's Institute was reorganized into the Dagestan State Women's Pedagogical Institute.

In 1964 it was transformed into the Dagestan State Pedagogical Institute. In 1994, the institute was transformed into the Dagestan State Pedagogical University.

More than 15 thousand people study at the DSPU every year. In the second half of the 2000s, DSPU ranked second in terms of the number of students among the universities of the Southern Federal District.

Structure 
Faculties
DSPU has 15 faculties (including one institute):
 Biology, Geography, and Chemistry
 Dagestan Philology
 Early Childhood Education
 Foreign Languages
 Historical
 Institute of Physics and Mathematics Information and Technological Education
 Primary Grades
 Management and Law
 Social Pedagogy and Psychology
 Special (defectological) Education
 Vocational-Pedagogical Education
 Physical Culture and Life Safety
 Philological
 Artistic and Graphics
 Musical and Pedagogical

Research institutes
 Research Institute of Defectology, Clinical Psychology, and Inclusive Education
 Research Institute of General and Inorganic Chemistry
 Research Institute of Philology

Branches
 Branch in Derbent

References

External links 
 Official site

Makhachkala
Educational institutions established in 1917
1917 establishments in Russia
Universities in Russia
Teachers colleges in Russia
Buildings and structures in Dagestan
Organizations based in Dagestan